York Township is one of the fourteen townships of Athens County, Ohio, United States. The 2010 census found 7,761 people in the township, 1,811 of whom lived in the unincorporated portions of the township.

Geography
Located in the northwestern corner of the county, it borders the following townships:
Ward Township, Hocking County - north
Trimble Township - northeast corner
Dover Township - east
Athens Township - southeast corner
Waterloo Township - south
Brown Township, Vinton County - southwest corner
Starr Township, Hocking County - west
Green Township, Hocking County - northwest corner

The city of Nelsonville is located in northern York Township, and the village of Buchtel is located in the northeast corner of the township.

Name and history
York Township was organized in 1818.

It is one of ten York Townships statewide.

Government
The township is governed by a three-member board of trustees, who are elected in November of odd-numbered years to a four-year term beginning on the following January 1. Two are elected in the year after the presidential election and one is elected in the year before it. There is also an elected township fiscal officer, who serves a four-year term beginning on April 1 of the year after the election, which is held in November of the year before the presidential election. Vacancies in the fiscal officership or on the board of trustees are filled by the remaining trustees.

Public services
The residents of York Township are served by the Nelsonville-York City School District and Nelsonville-York High School.

References

External links
County website

Townships in Athens County, Ohio
Townships in Ohio
1818 establishments in Ohio
Populated places established in 1818